Okan Demiriş (9 February 1942, in Istanbul – 18 June 2010) was a Turkish composer. He was married to the soprano Leyla Demiris.

His works include several operas:
 IV. Murat (pronounced Dördüncü Murat) libretto: Turan Oflazoğlu three acts, based on the life of Murad IV.  
 1977-79 Karyağdı Hatun, libretto: Nezihe Araz in three acts
 1982-83 Yusuf ile Züleyha, libretto: Nezihe Araz.

References

Turkish composers
1942 births
2010 deaths